Middletown Township is a township in Delaware County, Pennsylvania, United States. The population was 15,807 at the 2010 census. The Pennsylvania State University has an undergraduate satellite campus called Penn State Brandywine located in the north-central portion of the township. Located outside of Philadelphia, it constitutes part of the Delaware Valley (i.e. the Philadelphia metro area).

Originally established in 1686, Middletown Township adopted a Home Rule Charter in 1978. The township is governed by the council-manager system, a representative form of government in which the seven elected officials set policy for the township and the manager oversees the delivery of all public services and programs.

History
Middletown Township was probably established as a township in 1686, but it is first mentioned in 1687 when John Martin was established as constable. The name of the township is believed to be derived from its position in the middle or central of Chester County where it resided until 1789 when Delaware County was created from the eastern portion of Chester County. Delaware County played an important role in the anti-slavery movement. Not only did residence advocate for manumission, noted local families such as the Van Leer's bought and sold lots to free black tradesmen or only to people who were supportive of the free black community. The location is now known as Van Leer Avenue. The local community grew with support from local neighbors.

The John J. Tyler Arboretum and Ridley Creek State Park are listed on the National Register of Historic Places.

Geography
Middletown Township is in central Delaware County, west of Media, the county seat, and northwest of Chester. The census-designated place of Lima occupies the north-central part of the township. Other unincorporated communities in the township include Elwyn and Bortondale in the east, Riddlewood near the center, Glen Riddle south of the center, Lenni and Wawa in the southwest.

Ridley Creek forms the eastern border of the township, and Chester Creek is the western border. Both creeks flow southeast toward the Delaware River.

Middletown Township straddles the boundary between a hot-summer humid continental climate (Dfa) and a humid subtropical climate (Cfa.) The hardiness zone is 7a.

Demographics

As of Census 2010, the racial makeup of the township was 92.3% White, 3.4% African American, 0.1% Native American, 2.8% Asian, 0.6% from other races, and 0.9% from two or more races. Hispanic or Latino of any race were 1.6% of the population .

As of the census of 2000, there were 16,064 people, 5,524 households, and 3,756 families residing in the township. The population density was 1,192.6 people per square mile (460.5/km). There were 5,641 housing units at an average density of 418.8 per square mile (161.7/km). The racial makeup of the township was 94.28% White, 3.08% African American, 0.03% Native American, 1.71% Asian, 0.02% Pacific Islander, 0.16% from other races, and 0.72% from two or more races. Hispanic or Latino of any race were 0.87% of the population.

There were 5,524 households, out of which 29.0% had children under the age of 18 living with them, 59.0% were married couples living together, 6.8% had a female householder with no husband present, and 32.0% were non-families. 28.5% of all households were made up of individuals, and 19.0% had someone living alone who was 65 years of age or older. The average household size was 2.45 and the average family size was 3.05.

In the township the population was spread out, with 20.6% under the age of 18, 6.0% from 18 to 24, 21.8% from 25 to 44, 23.0% from 45 to 64, and 28.7% who were 65 years of age or older. The median age was 46 years. For every 100 females, there were 84.3 males. For every 100 females age 18 and over, there were 79.1 males.

The median income for a household in the township was $62,949, and the median income for a family was $77,649. Males had a median income of $54,495 versus $39,792 for females. The per capita income for the township was $29,418. About 1.1% of families and 2.5% of the population were below the poverty line, including 0.9% of those under age 18 and 3.4% of those age 65 or over.

Economy

Wawa Food Markets has its main dairy plant and "Corporate University" in Middletown, while its headquarters are in Chester Heights, just to the south of the township.

Elwyn Inc., a facility caring for the needs of the developmentally disabled and disadvantaged is located in Middletown Township.

An enclosed shopping mall called the Granite Run Mall was located in Middletown Township. The mall closed in 2015 and was demolished for a mixed-use development consisting of residential, retail, and entertainment called the Promenade at Granite Run, which opened in 2018.

Education
Middletown Township lies within the Rose Tree Media School District. It was created by a merger between the Media Borough and Rose Tree Union School Districts in 1966.

Public school students residing within township boundaries attend either Glenwood Elementary School, Indian Lane Elementary School (housed in the old Indian Lane Junior High School), Media Elementary School (housed in the old Media Borough High School), or Rose Tree Elementary School for grades K-5, depending on where they live. Springton Lake Middle School serves students in grades 6–8, and Penncrest High School, which is in the township limits, serves students in grades 9–12.

The Middletown Friends School is the only private school located within township boundaries.

For higher education, the township is home to the Wawa Corporate Training Center, the Williamson College of the Trades, and Penn State Brandywine

The township is also serviced by the Middletown Free Library.

Transportation

U.S. Route 1 (Baltimore Pike) passes through the township from southwest to northeast, while Pennsylvania Route 352 crosses it from northwest to southeast. Pennsylvania Route 452 begins at PA 352 in the center of Lima and runs south.

Middletown Township is served by SEPTA's Media/Wawa Line at Wawa station, which opened on August 21, 2022, with a 600 car garage, and Elwyn station, providing train service to Philadelphia.

Former train stations
 Darlington station (SEPTA)
 Lenni station
 Williamson School station

Notable people
Edward Darlington – U.S. Congressman
Joseph McClellan – Continental Army officer and Pennsylvania State Senator
Samuel Riddle – textile manufacturer

Fire companies

Middletown Township is served by two fire companies. Middletown Fire Company No. 1 and Rocky Run Fire Company. Middletown Fire Company, currently ran by Chief Duke Nassino and Deputy Chief Eric Mellon has existed since 1922, while Rocky Run Fire Company, led by Chief William Cairns and Deputy Chief David Beresford was chartered in 2013 following a merger between Lima and Lenni Heights Fire Companies. Middletown Fire Company is the designated Rescue company  of the Township due to them having Squad-Pumper 50, which is due to be replaced by Rescue 50 in 2022.

Other emergency services
Police protection is handled by the Pennsylvania State Police. Emergency medical services are handled by Riddle Memorial Hospital's Paramedic Units. Furthermore, Rocky Run Fire Company possesses an ambulance to serve the township. Brookhaven Fire Company AMB-52a-b also commonly takes medical alarms within the township.

References

Further reading

External links

Middletown Township official website

 
Townships in Delaware County, Pennsylvania
Townships in Pennsylvania